Signal in the Night (German: Signal in der Nacht) is a 1937 German war drama film directed by Richard Schneider-Edenkoben and starring Sybille Schmitz, Inge List and Hannes Stelzer. Location shooting took place at Grünwald Castle and around Bad Reichenhall in Bavaria.

Synopsis
A young Austrian woman marries an Italian count without really being in love with him, while secretly being admired by an Austrian captain. Things are complicated by the outbreak of the First World War in which the two countries become enemies.

Cast
 Sybille Schmitz as Brigitte von Schachen 
 Inge List as Nina Bernini 
 Hannes Stelzer as Capitano Mario Bernini - ihr Bruder 
 Curt Ackermann as Conte Cesare Bernini - beider Bruder 
 Hannsgeorg Laubenthal as Hauptmann Franz von Auersperg 
 Harald Paulsen as Pionierhauptmann Urban 
 Julia Serda as Brigittes Tante 
 Hans Leibelt as Schneblinger - Bursche von Auersberg 
 Karel Stepanek as Korporal Tschepski 
 Viktor Gehring as Zugführer Hirrlinger 
 Ernst Waldow as Emmerich - Bursche von Urban 
 Paul Bildt Professor Allmendinger 
 Arnim Suessenguth as Oberst v. Eidam 
 Otz Tollen as Oberleutnant Rickert 
 Harry Hardt as Italienischer Korporal 
 Max Vierlinger as Italienischer Sprengtrupp 
 Helmut Hoffmann as Italienischer Sprengstrupp 
 Helmut Heyne as Italienischer Sprengtrupp 
 Edmund Pouch as Italienischer Sprengtrupp 
 Norbert Kawczynski as Italienischer Sprengtrupp

References

Bibliography
 Moeller, Felix. The Film Minister: Goebbels and the Cinema in the Third Reich. Axel Menges, 2000.

External links 
 

1937 films
1937 comedy films
German comedy films
Films of Nazi Germany
1930s German-language films
Films directed by Richard Schneider-Edenkoben
German black-and-white films
Tobis Film films
German World War I films
World War I films set on the Italian Front
1930s German films